Winter Wonderland is a piece of interactive fiction written by Laura A. Knauth about the adventures of a young girl in a winter-themed fantasy land. It won the 1999 annual Interactive Fiction Competition. The game features ASCII art which can be disabled.

References
Game entry at Baf's guide

1990s interactive fiction